Peripheral Interchange Program (PIP) was a utility to transfer files on and between devices on Digital Equipment Corporation's computers. It was first implemented on the PDP-6 architecture by Harrison "Dit" Morse early in the 1960s.  It was subsequently implemented for DEC's operating systems for PDP-10, PDP-11, and PDP-8 architectures.
In the 1970s and 1980s Digital Research implemented PIP on CP/M  and MP/M.

History
It is said that during development it was named ATLATL, which is an acronym for "Anything, Lord to Anything, Lord."  This humorously described both its purpose as a device-independent file copying tool and the difficulties at the time of safely copying files between devices.

The original PIP syntax was

 PIP destination←source /switches

using the left-arrow character from the ASCII-1963 character set that the Flexowriter keyboards of the time used.  As other terminals were introduced that used later versions of ASCII (without the left-arrow character), PIP allowed the syntax

 PIP destination=source

The underscore (_) character, which was in the same ASCII character position that left-arrow had occupied, was still supported to separate the destination and source specifications.

Source and destination were file specification strings.  These consisted of a device name, typically 2 characters for device type such as DK (disk), LP (line printer), MT (magnetic tape), etc. and a unit number from 0 to 7, a colon, filename and extension.

Copying was generally permitted between any file specification to any other where it made sense.

Early versions of VAX/VMS implemented certain DCL commands, such as DIRECTORY and RENAME, by running RSX-11M PIP in compatibility mode. This usage of PIP was replaced by VAX-specific code in VAX/VMS 2.0, but PIP remained as part of the VAX-11 RSX layered product for VMS.

As late as the mid 1980s, PIP was still in common use on TOPS-10, TOPS-20 and PDP-11 systems.

PIP in CP/M and MP/M

Gary Kildall, who developed CP/M and MP/M, based much of the design of its file structure and command processor on operating systems from Digital Equipment, such as RSTS/E for the PDP-11. Besides accessing files on a floppy disk, the PIP command in CP/M could also transfer data to and from the following "special files":
 — console (input and output)
 — an auxiliary device.
 — list output device, usually the printer
 — null device, akin to \Device\Null and /dev/null
 — input device that produced end-of-file characters, ASCII 
 — custom input device, by default the same as 
 — punch card unit:
 — custom output device, by default the same as 

These were not true device files, however, because their handling was limited to PIP.

In addition to the usual PIP destination=source syntax, PIP under CP/M still allowed the old PIP destination_source form. This behaviour was not documented, and CP/M generally did not have a standard for which characters could appear in file names; therefore other programs could and did create filenames containing underscore characters, which PIP could not handle.

See also
copy (command) – RT-11, RSX-11, OpenVMS, AmigaOS, DOS, OS/2 and Microsoft Windows command for copying data
cp (Unix) – Unix command for copying data
Kermit (protocol)

References

CP/M software
File copy utilities